Club Social y Deportivo San Antonio Unido, usually referred to as SAU is a football club located in the port city of San Antonio, Chile, situated in the Valparaíso Region. It was founded on July 21, 1961. Its football team currently plays in Segunda División.

History
The club was created in 1961, in order to bring the enjoyment of football to a growing port city that was experiencing a surge with internal migration. In 1967 the club was known as San Antonio Unido Portuario (SAUP) in order to include the management company that was in charge of the port.

After 1975 the name returned as San Antonio Unido until 1983, when the team was relegated to the Chilean third division never returning to the Primera B. The club experienced a financial recession of eight years and were not active until being refounded on December 10, 1991, adding the Social to their club name.

Squad
.

Honours
Copa Apertura Segunda División: 1970

External links
 Official Web Site
 No official Web Site
 Fans Web Site

See also
Chilean football league system

Football clubs in Chile
Association football clubs established in 1961
1961 establishments in Chile